Tamabil is a hilly area in Sylhet on the border between Bangladesh and the Indian state of Meghalaya about 5 km from Jaflong.
 

It stands on the Sylhet-Shillong Road some 55 km from Sylhet town in Bangladesh.
It is well known for the Bangladesh Last House, which is located on the Bangladesh–India border, and the Jaiñtia Hill Resort.

Gallery

References

Sylhet District